The 2005 CIS football season began on September 1, 2005, and concluded with the 41st Vanier Cup national championship on December 3 at Ivor Wynne Stadium in Hamilton, Ontario, with the Wilfrid Laurier Golden Hawks winning their second championship. Twenty-seven universities across Canada competed in CIS football this season, the highest level of amateur play in Canadian football, under the auspices of Canadian Interuniversity Sport (CIS).

Awards and records

Awards 
 Hec Crighton Trophy – Andy Fantuz, Western Ontario
 Presidents' Trophy – Patrick Donovan, Concordia
 Russ Jackson Award – Dan Parker, Mount Allison
 J. P. Metras Trophy – Dominic Picard, Laval
 Peter Gorman Trophy – Martin Gagné, Montreal

All-Canadian team 
First Team
Offence
Ryan Pyear, QB, Laurier 
Daryl Stephenson, RB, Windsor 
David Stevens, RB, Saskatchewan 
Andrew Fantuz, WR, Western 
Ivan Birungi, WR, Acadia 
Arjei Franklin, SB, Windsor 
J-F Romeo, SB, Laval 
Dominic Picard, C, Laval 
Adam Krajewski, G, Simon Fraser 
Kyle Koch, G, McMaster 
Chris Sutherland, T, Saskatchewan 
Chris Best, T, Waterloo 
Defence
Martin Gagné, DE, Montréal 
Kyle Markin, DE, Acadia 
Michaël Jean-Louis, DT, Laval 
Ryan Gottselig, DT, Saskatchewan 
Patrick Donovan, LB, Concordia 
Jason Pottinger, LB, McMaster 
Stephen Wilson, LB, Regina 
Eric Nielsen, CB, Acadia 
Modibo Sidibe, CB, Concordia 
Ian Logan, HB, Laurier 
Sammy Okpro, HB, Concordia 
Jason Milne, FS, Alberta 
Special Teams
Mike Renaud, P, Concordia 
Warren Kean, K, Concordia 
Second Team 
Offense
Scott Syvret, QB, Concordia 
Nick Cameron, RB, Laurier 
Joseph Mroué, RB, Montréal 
Andrew Ginther, WR, Alberta 
Jeff Keegan, WR, Guelph 
Vaughan Swart, SB, McMaster 
Mike Lindstrom, SB, UBC 
Kevin Kelly, C, Ottawa 
Adam Rogers, G, Acadia 
Woodly Jean, G, Montreal 
J.F. Morin-Roberge, T, Montreal 
Derek Armstrong, T, StFX 
Defence
Brandon Keks, DE, Laurier 
Dan Federkeil, DE, Calgary 
Miguel Robede, DT, Laval 
Simon Patrick, DT, Manitoba 
David Lowry, LB, Alberta 
Marc Trépanier, LB, Montréal 
Matt Harding, LB, Mount Allison 
Anthony Plante-Ajah, CB, Ottawa 
Joel Lipinski, CB, Regina 
Alexandre Vendette, HB, Laval 
Steve Boyko, HB, Alberta 
Jeff Smeaton, FS, Laurier 
Special Teams
Luca Congi, P, Simon Fraser 
Brian Devlin, K, Laurier

Results

Regular season standings 
Note: GP = Games Played, W = Wins, L = Losses, OTL = Overtime Losses, PF = Points For, PA = Points Against, Pts = Points

''Teams in bold have earned playoff berths.

Top 10

NR = Not Ranked.

Championships 
The Vanier Cup is played between the champions of the Mitchell Bowl and the Uteck Bowl, the national semi-final games. In 2005, according to the rotating schedule, the winners of the Canada West conference Hardy Trophy meet the Dunsmore Cup Quebec champion for the Mitchell Bowl. The winners of the Atlantic conference Loney Bowl championship travel to the Ontario conference's Yates Cup championship team for the Uteck Bowl.

Vanier Cup

Notes 

U Sports football seasons
CIS football season